Portugal competed at the 2022 World Games held in Birmingham, United States from 7 to 17 July 2022. Athletes representing Portugal won one gold medal, three silver medals and one bronze medal. The country finished in 36th place in the medal table.

Medalists

Competitors
The following is the list of number of competitors in the Games.

Acrobatic gymnastics

Portugal won two medals in acrobatic gymnastics.

Aerobic gymnastics

Portugal competed in aerobic gymnastics.

Artistic roller skating

Portugal won one gold medal in artistic roller skating.

Canoe marathon

Portugal won one medal in canoe marathon.

Kickboxing

Portugal competed in kickboxing.

Men

Women

Korfball

Portugal competed in korfball.

Muaythai

Portugal won one silver medal in muaythai.

Road speed skating

Portugal competed in road speed skating.

Track speed skating

Portugal competed in track speed skating.

Trampoline gymnastics

Portugal competed in trampoline gymnastics.

References

Nations at the 2022 World Games
2022
World Games